RK Livonia is a Latvian rugby club based in the village of Upesciems in Ropaži Municipality. The name of the club refers to the historic region of Livonia (now Vidzeme) in which the municipality is located.

History
The club was founded in 2007.

External links
RK Livonia

Latvian rugby union teams
Ropaži Municipality
Rugby clubs established in 2007